The Royal Navy of the Kingdom of the Two Sicilies (Real Marina del Regno delle Due Sicilie or Armata di Mare di S.M. il Re del Regno delle Due Sicilie) was the official term in documents of the era for the naval forces of the Kingdom of the Two Sicilies - it and the Royal Army together formed the Kingdom's armed forces. The modern use of the term Regio for royal was only introduced into the force's title after the annexation of the Kingdom of Sardinia. It was the most important of the pre-unification Italian navies and Cavour made it the model of the new Italian Regia Marina after the annexation of the Two Sicilies.

The Sea Army of the Kingdom of the Two Sicilies 
In June 1815 Ferdinand returned to Naples from Palermo together with the Bourbon Navy. With the simultaneous defeat of Murat, two vessels were handed over to the British, the corvette, two schooners, 24 gunboats and the two frigates, which were ceded to Ferdinand, who thus found himself a large and modern fleet. Largely the navy structure of this period was based on the Norman-Arab structure of navy as well as the Spanish royal Navy.

In December 1816 it formed the Kingdom of the Two Sicilies, unifying the two previous kingdoms, and the king took the name Ferdinand I. In 1818 the General Ordinances of the Royal Navy of the Two Sicilies were promulgated relating to the entire composition and organization of the Navy: this is the first regulation made by the new kingdom in the maritime field; they constituted various bodies of officers, a nautical observatory, an Accademia di Marina and three Maritime Compartments: Naples, Palermo and Messina. In the same year the new Marine Regulation.

In 1820 the Navy was considerably strengthened, aligning three divisions with about seventy warships of all toes, with a clear prevalence of light woods.

In July 1820 the frigate Amalia (formerly Carolina), together with other ships, escorted to Sicily a convoy of merchant ships bearing the Expeditionary Corps of Lieutenant General Florestano Pepe, sent to repress the insurrection of the island. On September 2, 1820, a fleet with the Amalia, the vessel Capri, the corvette Leone, the "Polacca" Sant'Antonio e Italia and 14 brigantini (force then increased with the sending, the following day, of six gunboats and a bomb), left Naples again and was sent to Sicily with other landing troops, to repress the revolutionary movements.

Between 1827 and 1828 the frigate Regina Isabella of 44 cannons, the corvette Cristina of 32 guns and the brigantines Prince Charles and Francis I entered service.

References